Microseris is a genus of plants in the tribe Cichorieae within the family Asteraceae, native to North America, Australia, and New Zealand. It contains the following species:

Microseris acuminata – Sierra foothill silverpuffs – CA OR
Microseris aliciae – CA
Microseris anomala – Channel Islands 
Microseris astrata – CA
Microseris bigelovii – coastal silverpuffs – CA OR WA BC
Microseris borealis – northern silverpuffs – CA OR WA BC
Microseris breviseta – CA
Microseris callicarpha – CA
Microseris campestris – San Joaquin silverpuffs – CA
Microseris castanea 
Microseris cognata – CA
Microseris conjugens – CA
Microseris decipiens – Santa Cruz silverpuffs – CA
Microseris douglasii – Douglas' silverpuffs – CA OR Baja California
Microseris elegans – elegant silverpuffs – CA
Microseris furfuracea – CA
Microseris heterocarpa – grassland silverpuffs – CA AZ Baja California Guadeloupe
Microseris howellii – Howell's silverpuffs – OR 
Microseris insignis – CA
Microseris intermedia – CA
Microseris laciniata – cutleaf silverpuffs – CA NV OR WA 
Microseris lanceolata – Australia
Microseris leiosperma – CA
Microseris leucocarpha – CA
Microseris maritima – CA
Microseris melanocarpha – CA
Microseris neozelandica – New Zealand
Microseris nevadensis – CA NV 
Microseris nutans – western USA, BC
Microseris obtusata – CA
Microseris oligantha – CA
Microseris paludosa – marsh silverpuffs – CA
Microseris parvula – CA
Microseris picta – CA
Microseris proxima – CA
Microseris pulchella – CA
Microseris scapigera – New Zealand, Australia
Microseris stenocarpha – CA
Microseris sylvatica – sylvan scorzonella – CA
Microseris tasmanica – Tasmania
Microseris teakleana – Western Australia
Microseris tenuisecta – CA
Microseris walteri – murnong, yam daisy – Australia

References

External links

Jepson Manual Treatment: Microseris

 
Asteraceae genera